KLZZ (103.7 FM) is a radio station in St. Cloud, Minnesota airing a classic rock format. The station is owned by Townsquare Media.

The station's studios, along with Townsquare's other St. Cloud stations, are located at 640 Lincoln Avenue SE, on St. Cloud's east side.

The station is an affiliate of the syndicated Floydian Slip Pink Floyd show.

External links
103.7 The Loon official website

Radio stations in St. Cloud, Minnesota
Classic rock radio stations in the United States
Radio stations established in 1989
1983 establishments in Minnesota
Townsquare Media radio stations